Abercarn Rugby Football Club are a Welsh rugby union club based in Abercarn near the city of Newport. They currently play in the Welsh Rugby Union Division 3 having been relegated in two consecutive seasons; from Division 3 East in 2007 and Division 4 East in 2008. The club then immediately gained promotion back to Division 4 East in 2009 and then gained promotion back to Div 3 in 2012, winning the Swalec Bowl in 2010 along the way.  Abercarn RFC is a feeder club for the Newport Gwent Dragons.

Club history
Abercarn is a club with a long history having been founded over 100 years ago. In 1950 Abercarn RFC lost three members of their club including their club captain, Don Rowlands and coach, Ray Box in the Llandow air disaster. The event is remembered by the club in their team badge, with a plane propeller sitting in its centre.

Abercarn RFC have produced some famous players including Paul Turner (Newport RFC, Pontypool RFC, Newport Gwent Dragons Coach) and Nathan Budgett (Wales & Bristol RFC).

Abercarn currently plays at the Walfare Ground, at the rear of Cwmcarn High School.

For the start of the 2009/2010 season, Abercarn RFC has reintroduced a development team known as the 'Abercarn Devils' who compete in the Worthington Gwent 2nd XV Division.  The Devils play their home fixtures on Cwmcarn School Fields.

Former outside half Ben Farley made the locally hugely controversial move to rivals Risca RFC in the summer of 2010, the first time this has happened since 1937.

Notable former players
 Norman Harris (7 caps for Wales rugby league) 
 Dicky Ralph (6 caps)
 David 'Dai' Rees

Club honours
2008-09 WRU Division Five East - Champions
2009-10 SWALEC Bowl - Champions

References

External links
 Abercarn rugby football club

Welsh rugby union teams